Romance of the Rio Grande is a 1941 American Western film directed by Herbert I. Leeds and written by Harold Buchman and Samuel G. Engel. The film stars Cesar Romero, Patricia Morison, Lynne Roberts, Ricardo Cortez, Chris-Pin Martin and Aldrich Bowker. The film was released on January 17, 1941, by 20th Century Fox.

Plot
Knowing that his greedy nephew Ricardo hopes to inherit his ranch, aging and ailing Don Fernando de Vega sends for his grandson, Carlos Hernandez, his preferred heir. The stagecoach carrying Carlos is attacked and he is shot by Carver, a gunman sent by Ricardo and his scheming sweetheart Rosita. As he lays injured, Carlos is found by the Cisco Kid, a bandit who sees the attack on the stagecoach. Struck by their uncanny resemblance, Cisco takes him to have the bullet taken out by a friend in a nearby hacienda, and he finds a letter from Don Fernando and decides to impersonate him.

Ricardo and Rosita are stunned to see "Carlos" alive, unaware the real one is off recovering from his bullet wound. Cisco makes romantic passes at both Rosita and the lovely Maria Cordova, goddaughter of the Don. Cisco comes to respect Don Fernando de Vega, and when he finds out the nephew is trying to take ranch by force, he goes against the nephew Ricardo. By the time his scheme is done, Ricardo and Rosita have shot one another in a jealous rage, while Carlos returns to claim his rightful inheritance and Maria.

Cast 
Cesar Romero as Cisco Kid / Carlos
Patricia Morison as Rosita
Lynne Roberts as Maria Cordova
Ricardo Cortez as Ricardo de Vega 
Chris-Pin Martin as Gordito
Aldrich Bowker as Padre Martinez
Joseph MacDonald as Carlos Hernandez 
Inez Palange as Mama Lopez
Pedro de Cordoba as Don Fernando de Vega
Ray Bennett as Henchman Carver
Trevor Bardette as Henchman Manuel
Tom London as U. S. Marshal
Eva Puig as Marta

References

External links
 

1941 films
20th Century Fox films
American Western (genre) films
1941 Western (genre) films
Films directed by Herbert I. Leeds
Cisco Kid
American black-and-white films
1940s English-language films
1940s American films